Radical 14 or radical cover, meaning cover, is one of 23 of the 214 Kangxi radicals that are composed of 2 strokes.

In the Kangxi Dictionary, there are 30 characters (out of 49,030) to be found under this radical.

 is also the 19th indexing component in the Table of Indexing Chinese Character Components predominantly adopted by Simplified Chinese dictionaries published in mainland China.

Evolution

Derived characters

Literature 

Leyi Li: “Tracing the Roots of Chinese Characters: 500 Cases”. Beijing 1993, 
 KangXi:  page 130, character 12
 Dai Kanwa Jiten: character 1565
 Dae Jaweon: page 292, character 12
 Hanyu Da Zidian: volume 1, page 302, character 14

External links

Unihan data for U+5196

014
019